Joseph Bentley Beardsell (17 March 1907 – 13 January 1978) was an Anglo-Indian first-class cricketer.

Beardsell was born at Stockport in March 1907. He was educated at Clifton College, before going up to Emmanuel College, Cambridge. After graduating from Oxford, he worked for the family company J. B. Beardsell Ltd in Manchester, before moving to British India in 1933 where he gained employment in Madras with another family company, W. A. Beardsell Ltd, which specialised in exports. He was a prominent rugby union player in Madras, playing in the All India Rugby Tournament for Madras Rugby Club from 1933 to 1935. Beardsell was a captain in the Indian Auxiliary Force by the time of the Second World War, with him being commissioned into the Royal Artillery during the war as a second lieutenant in November 1941. He remained in India following the end of the war in 1945 and subsequent Indian independence in 1947. Beardsell played first-class cricket for the Europeans cricket team in January 1948 against the Indians in the Madras Presidency Match; this match was to be the Europeans final appearance in first-class cricket. Batting once, he was dismissed in the Europeans first innings for 16 runs by K. S. Kannan. He later worked as a commercial manager for the Madras Electrical Supply Corporation and the Madras Electric Tramways. Beardsell died at Madras in January 1978.

References

External links

1907 births
1978 deaths
People from Stockport
People educated at Clifton College
Alumni of Emmanuel College, Cambridge
British Army personnel of World War II
Royal Artillery officers
English cricketers
Indian cricketers
Europeans cricketers
British people in colonial India